Pic del Segre or Puigmal del Segre is a mountain of France and Spain.
The Segre River has its source by this peak.

See also
Pic Petit de Segre

References

Vall de Núria Map, ed. Alpina

External links
 Hiking from Fontalba

Mountains of Catalonia
Mountains of Pyrénées-Orientales
Mountains of the Pyrenees